Baoshan station or Baoshan railway station may refer to:

 Baoshan railway station (Taiwan), a railway station in Taoyuan District, Taoyuan City, Taiwan
 Baoshan railway station (Yunnan), a railway station in Longyang District, Baoshan, Yunnan, China
 , a metro station in Licheng District, Jinan, Shandong Province, China
 , a railway station under construction on the Husutong railway, in Baoshan District, Shanghai, China